The 2009 NASCAR Sprint Cup Series was the 61st season of professional stock car racing in the United States, the 38th modern-era Cup series, and the last Cup season of the 21st century's first decade, the 2000s. The season included 36 races and two exhibition races with the regular season beginning with the Daytona 500 at Daytona International Speedway and ending with the Ford 400 at Homestead-Miami Speedway.  The final ten races were known as 2009 Chase for the Sprint Cup. Rick Hendrick won the Owners' Championship, while Jimmie Johnson won the Drivers' Championship with a fifth-place finish at the final race of the season. Chevrolet won the Manufacturers' Championship with 248 points.

2009 was the first season without NASCAR legends Johnny Benson (since 1995), Dale Jarrett (since 1985) and Kyle Petty (since 1978) after they retired following the 2008 season. It was also, significantly, the first in Cup Series history in which no Petty family driver competed during the season.

Teams and drivers

Complete schedule
Because of the merger of Dale Earnhardt, Inc. with Chip Ganassi Racing, the No. 01 and No. 15 teams closed after the 2008 season. However, the owners' points from the No. 15 were transferred to the No. 34, while points from either the No. 01 or No. 41 was transferred to the No. 07, with the No. 33 car, owned by Richard Childress, receiving the other. (NASCAR allows for a transfer if the original owner maintains some stake in the team to which points are transferred.) 2009 also saw the demise of Petty Enterprises, which merged with Gillette Evernham Motorsports.  The new company would be called Richard Petty Motorsports, forming a 4 car team with Kasey Kahne in the No. 9, Elliott Sadler in the No. 19, Reed Sorenson driving the famed No. 43, and A. J. Allmendinger driving the No. 44.  Also Bill Davis Racing was bought by Triad Racing, however the No. 22 was bought by Penske Racing with Bill Davis holding minority interest. The No. 22's points were transferred to the No. 77, thus guaranteeing that car a spot in the Daytona 500 should all other transfers occur. There were 41 full-time teams in 2009.

Limited schedule

Notes

Major news stories

Economic effects

Mergers, contractions, and alliances
The economic crisis of 2008 caused problems even before the 2009 season began.  While gas (and diesel) prices came down to nearly $2.00 per gallon, corporate America was reluctant to shell out millions of dollars to sponsor teams due to the volatility of the stock market.  As a result, Chip Ganassi Racing merged with Dale Earnhardt, Inc. to form Earnhardt Ganassi Racing with Felix Sabates. They fielded the No. 1 and No. 8 from DEI and No. 42 from Ganassi, and shut down the DEI No. 01 and No. 15 teams as well as Ganassi's No. 40 and No. 41 teams, as the No. 40 was a full-time team in 2008 until July, when it was closed for a lack of sponsorship. The No. 42 team will run under the Chevrolet banner under the merger as it changes from Dodge. In addition, Front Row Motorsports has EGR support for their No. 34 car, to be driven by John Andretti.  On January 19, Petty Enterprises merged with Gillett Evernham Motorsports for the merger with Petty's famous No. 43 joining the newly renamed Richard Petty Motorsports. On December 22, 2008, Bill Davis Racing was sold to California businessman Mike Held and BDR vice president Marty Gaunt, and was renamed Triad Racing Development. Hall of Fame Racing announced an alliance with Yates Racing on January 13, 2009, and named Bobby Labonte as the new driver of the No. 96 team as they move from Toyota to Ford.  The first in-season casualty was the No. 28 team of Travis Kvapil owned by Yates Racing, ceasing operations following the Food City 500 on March 22. On April 7, the second casualty of the season was the famous No. 8, which folded because of a lack of sponsorship, leaving Aric Almirola without a ride. On September 10, it was announced that Yates Racing and RPM would merge, closing the No. 44 and No. 96 teams as a result for the 2010 season and the No. 9, No. 19 and No. 43 teams will switch to Ford.

The elimination of testing
On November 14, 2008, NASCAR announced, as another cost-cutting measure, that teams will no longer be allowed to test on NASCAR-sanctioned tracks in all three major series. Traditionally, they had had preseason tests at Daytona and Las Vegas, along with as many as four additional in-season sessions at tracks, but all teams also use unsanctioned tracks (such as Rockingham Speedway) for their tests. The testing ban covers all tracks used on NASCAR's three national series, plus tracks that host events in the Camping World East and West circuits. This radically reduces the number of tracks that can be used for testing, with Rockingham being one of the few major tracks still available. This meant that the annual "Pre-Season Thunder" testing events, which covered all three major touring series at Daytona was cancelled for 2009. However, a fan fest remained in place with the thunder provided by the Richard Petty Driving Experience for fans to ride in a special two-seat stock car. However, Goodyear will still conduct tire tests, such as at Indianapolis Motor Speedway. A total of seven tests were conducted at Indianapolis following the 2008 Allstate 400 at the Brickyard tire debacle.

Reduction in manufacturer support
Following General Motors' bankruptcy, GM cut all financial support in the Nationwide and Camping World Truck Series, and considerably reduced financial support in the Sprint Cup Series. Similarly, the Chrysler bankruptcy led to several Dodge Sprint Cup teams, including Richard Petty Motorsports, losing their manufacturer support; as stated earlier, RPM will merge with Yates and have the No. 9, No. 19 and No. 43 cars switch to Ford for the 2010 season. Dodge claims that "funding is on hold." Toyota gave a small reduction in funding before the season, but has not made any mid-season cuts. Rumors have floated that Toyota may leave the Camping World Truck Series or Nationwide Series; the automaker has denied these reports. Ford, the healthiest of all the automakers, continues funding at pre-crisis levels. From the 2005 season it has been rumored that Honda will join the Nationwide and Sprint Cup series, and the rumor gets stronger entering the 2009 season, as Dodge claimed its funding on hold. This was denied by the manufacturer.

Town-hall meeting
On Tuesday, May 26, 2009, NASCAR held a town-hall meeting closed to the public and media with its drivers and owners to discuss a range of topics. Major topics discussed included the Jeremy Mayfield substance abuse suspension controversy, along with double-file restarts, the controversial Car of Tomorrow, sponsorship, testing, the reduction in TV ratings and attendance, and competition in general. All attendees considered the meeting a success.

Double-file restarts
Before the start of the season, NASCAR changed restart rules regarding the final moments of all races in the Sprint Cup, Nationwide Series and Camping World Truck Series.  Previously, when the race was inside the final ten laps, all cars/trucks on the lead lap were in a single-file restart in that window.  As of the 2009 season, the window changed to the final 20 laps.  The "lucky dog"/"free pass" rule will still be eliminated in the last ten laps of a race.

However, before the June Pocono race, the entire restart procedure changed entirely in the NASCAR Sprint Cup Series. After being run successfully at the NASCAR Sprint Cup All-Star Race and in the Budweiser Shootout, NASCAR implemented a double-file restart system starting at Pocono for the NASCAR Sprint Cup Series. This change came at the request of fans, drivers, owners, and the media and as a result in a decrease in TV ratings during the NASCAR on Fox portion of the season. (The June Pocono race was the first race of the 2009 season on TNT.) The entire field will line up double-file, much like the start of the race at every restart. The leaders and other lead lap cars are now in front always when taking the green flag. Cars who choose to stay out and not pit during a caution flag who are in front of the leaders are now waved-around to restart (double file) at the back of the field. The lucky dog/free pass rule is now in effect the entire distance of the race, and the double-file restarts are for every restart, including green-white-checkered finishes. The only reasons cars do not line up double-file in the order they are position wise on the leaderboard is if they are serving a penalty (in most cases, for pit road violations). The leader of the race also has the option of selecting which lane, inside or outside, to restart in, however, the 3rd place car (and 5th, 7th, and so on) will always restart on the inside.

The new restart procedure began in the NASCAR Nationwide Series on July 3 at Daytona. NASCAR said it will not be it in the NASCAR Camping World Truck Series until at least 2010.

Jeremy Mayfield substance abuse controversy

Suspension
Two hours prior to the race at Darlington, NASCAR announced that driver Jeremy Mayfield has been suspended for a substance abuse policy violation. Mayfield said that the positive test was due to an interaction between a prescription drug and an over-the-counter drug. Mayfield had failed to qualify for the race.

Mayfield violated his suspension by being at Lowe's Motor Speedway for a press conference during the all-star race weekend.

The suspension is indefinite until Mayfield completes NASCAR's substance abuse program, which includes rehabilitation and additional testing.

Controversy
In the ensuing days and weeks following the initial suspension, NASCAR was widely criticized by fans, drivers, owners, the media, and the World Anti-Doping Agency for not publicly identifying the drug found in Mayfield's test and failing to publish its drug policy or a list of banned substances. NASCAR's drug policy was later published and reports and court filings (see below) indicate that the test was positive for amphetamines. Despite releasing this information, NASCAR has still not published a definitive list of banned substances, leading to continued criticism. However, NASCAR addressed the issue in its May meeting with the NASCAR owners and drivers, who now say they understand why NASCAR doesn't publish a list. Nonetheless, some remained skeptical of NASCAR's intentions, claiming that "if NASCAR sees something they don't like, they can suspend anyone at anytime." In the middle of the controversy, NASCAR randomly tested 10 NASCAR drivers, officials, and crew members during a rain delay at the Coca-Cola 600 during Memorial Day weekend.

ESPN reported on June 9 that Mayfield tested positive for methamphetamines. This was later confirmed in court.

Lawsuit
Mayfield sued NASCAR to have his suspension lifted. Mayfield says that he had taken Claritin-D, an allergy drug, in addition to Adderall, a prescription medication used to treat attention deficit disorder.  Adderall is an amphetamine.

An initial court hearing for a restraining order that would have allowed Mayfield to compete at Dover was ruled in NASCAR's favor. Mayfield's team, which has been taken over by his wife and driver J. J. Yeley, withdrew from the race at Dover. Mayfield sold his team in late July to raise funds for his legal defense. NASCAR has said that Mayfield's team may continue to compete with a different driver and under a different owner. Since Mayfield is suspended, he cannot be in the NASCAR garage area or anywhere where a NASCAR license is required.

NASCAR has successfully moved the case to federal court. NASCAR has also countersued Mayfield, accusing the suspended driver of willfully violating the substance abuse policy, breach of contract, and defrauding competitors of earnings. Mayfield earned approximately $150,000 from May 1 in NASCAR earnings. May 1 is when Mayfield claims he began taking the Claritin-D. On June 25, Mayfield formally denied ever taking methamphetamines in a pre-hearing affidavit filed in U.S. District Court, while NASCAR said that the test results proved he was a chronic user of meth and was a danger to public safety.

On July 1, U.S. District Court granted Mayfield a temporary injunction that lifted Mayfield's suspension and allowed him to resume his role as driver and owner. The court ruled the damage to Mayfield and was far exceeding the damage to NASCAR, and that there was a high probability that the second test sample was compromised. Mayfield did not return to the track, as his race team was low on funds and sponsors did not want to associate with Mayfield. He sold his team in late July.

On July 7, NASCAR appealed the U.S. District Court's ruling. On July 8, NASCAR formally filed an appeal with the U.S. Circuit Court of Appeals, one step away from the United States Supreme Court. NASCAR claimed that the district court's ruling undermines NASCAR's ability to police drug use and is asking that Mayfield may be re-suspended. The 4th Circuit Court of Appeals granted NASCAR a motion to re-suspend Mayfield on July 24 following a second drug test. NASCAR re-suspended Mayfield immediately.

Second drug test
On July 7, Mayfield submitted to a drug test. NASCAR said Mayfield was notified by an Aegis representative at 1:18 pm Monday to report to a nearby testing center within two hours, but the driver said he had to first speak to his attorney. After a delay, Mayfield's attorney told NASCAR that Mayfield couldn't get to the center by 3:18 pm, so NASCAR said it found a lab closer to his location. At 3:45 pm, Mayfield called the lab to say he was close but lost, and a receptionist offered to talk him the rest of the way. NASCAR said Mayfield told the lab he would call right back but no one was contacted until 5:30 pm, when Mayfield's attorney called NASCAR to inform them Mayfield could not find the location so the lawyer had sent him to an independent laboratory. Two testers and a NASCAR security officer arrived at Mayfield's home in Catawba County, N.C., at 7:20 pm, could not gain access for 10 minutes, and then weren't able to persuade Mayfield to give a sample until 8:20 pm. NASCAR called this seven-hour layover between the time requested for a test and the time a test was given a "classic delay tactic".

On July 15, NASCAR filed documents in U.S. District Court that indicated that Mayfield had once again tested positive for methamphetamines. In addition to the second test results, NASCAR also submitted an affidavit from Mayfield's stepmother in which she says that Mayfield used meth over 30 times in 7 years through snorting it up his nose. Mayfield says that "Brian France talking about effective drug programs is like having Al Capone talking about effective law enforcement," and that "I don't trust anything NASCAR does, anything (program administrator) Dr. David Black does, never have, never will." As for his stepmother, Mayfield says that "She's basically a whore. She shot and killed my dad." Lisa Mayfield (Jeremy's stepmother) has since filed a lawsuit suing Mayfield for $20,000 in damages. Mayfield says that he has been tested almost daily by an independent lab and every test result has come back negative.

Mayfield Motorsports' general manager resigned the same day, hours before the test results were released. The team has since been sold, and a few expect Mayfield to return to the track soon, if ever again.

Effect on drug testing
Many drivers have said that since the controversy began, the drug testing time has gone from a quick 5-minute in and out to a prolonged 45-minute process that includes identity verification.

Verizon Wireless and Penske Racing
In late 2008, Verizon merged with Alltel. As a result, per the grandfather clause, the team would run Verizon red on the No. 12 car, but would not run Verizon as a sponsor, placing Penske logos instead.

Schedule
The most significant schedule changes in the 2009 NASCAR schedule realignment included the addition of the Pepsi 500 at Auto Club Speedway to the 2009 Chase, the shifting of the AMP Energy 500 at Talladega Superspeedway to a later autumn date, and the placement of the Pep Boys Auto 500 at Atlanta Motor Speedway to Labor Day weekend as a night race. Additionally, there was a fourth off-week between the Sharpie 500 at Bristol Motor Speedway and the Pep Boys 500. The schedule changes are listed in boldface on the chart below.

Television and radio

United States
In their third year of the current NASCAR television agreement, Fox carried the Bud Shootout, the Daytona 500 and the first 13 races through Dover's June race.  Fox-owned Speed Channel aired the Gatorade Duels and Sprint All Star Race XXV. TNT then picked up the next six races starting at Pocono including the summer race at Daytona, the Coke Zero 400 with its "wide open format" coverage and ending at Chicago.  The Allstate 400 at the Brickyard started ESPN/ABC's coverage, including the entire Chase for the Sprint Cup on ABC.

New to Fox telecasts was 3-D CGI animated adventures of "Digger", the network's gopher cam mascot and his friends, Annie, Marbles, Grandpa and rival Lumpy Wheels (named after former Lowe's Motor Speedway chief Humpy Wheeler).  According to Digger's backstory, created by Fox Sports chairman David Hill, Digger lives underground at Talladega Superspeedway. The characters were also used in segues into and out of commercial breaks. However, Digger later became a harbor of criticism, as well as what most have cited as a cause of a deeper ratings decline than in years past, adding to already lower-than-normal ratings. More is mentioned here.

Hours before the July New Hampshire race on TNT, Bill Weber was removed from the broadcast booth and replaced by Ralph Sheheen for undisclosed personal reasons. TNT and NASCAR announced on July 1 that Sheheen would replace Weber for the final two races on TNT at Daytona and Chicagoland.

The annual changes at ABC/ESPN continue. Mike Massaro became a third host of NASCAR Now on ESPN2; Vince Welch replaced Massaro on pit road and Marty Reid is doing selected Nationwide Series events as well. But ESPN continues to face heavy criticism from NASCAR fans in result of bored announcers, bad camera work, excessive commercials and lack of post-race coverage.

On radio, Sirius XM Radio will carry all races in the series.  Terrestrial radio rights are being handled as follows:
 Motor Racing Network will carry races at tracks owned by their corporate sibling, International Speedway Corporation as well as the races at Dover and Pocono and the All-Star Race at Lowe's;
 Speedway Motorsports, Inc.-owned Performance Racing Network will carry events from those SMI tracks, and will jointly produce the Allstate 400 at the Brickyard with the Indianapolis Motor Speedway Radio Network.

Speed (replacing ESPN Classic) and MRN will be the broadcasters at the annual Sprint Cup Banquet at the Wynn Las Vegas Hotel Casino in said city on December 4.  Las Vegas replaces New York City as the host after 27 years there, 26 of the banquets being staged in The Waldorf=Astoria Hotel.

Other North American channels
In Canada, TSN and TSN 2 covered the 2009 season.

International
In Australia, Fox Sports showed all of the Sprint Cup races live across their networks. Network Ten also showed Qualifying, Final Practice (Happy Hour), a 1-hour highlights package and selected races live on its new digital sports multichannel, ONE.

In Portugal, all races this season were telecast on SportTv 3, while in Sweden, Viasat Motor televised the races. In nearby Finland, Urheilu+Kanava telecasted the season's events, and in Great Britain and Ireland, the whole season was again telecasted on Sky Sports, in Spain Teledeporte televised six races of the season live.

In Latin America all the races were broadcast on Speed Latin America. They did not telecast practices or qualifying.

2009 season races

Regular season

Budweiser Shootout

The Budweiser Shootout, ran on February 7, is an exhibition race that traditionally is contested by all pole winners from the previous season.  This year however, after an announcement made during the previous season, the top six teams from each competing manufacturer based on 2008 owner's points, plus a wild card entry from each manufacturer would be entered to run this race.  Paul Menard drew the pole.

Top 10 results

29 – Kevin Harvick
26 – Jamie McMurray
14 – Tony Stewart
24 – Jeff Gordon
44 – A. J. Allmendinger
9 – Kasey Kahne
99 – Carl Edwards
17 – Matt Kenseth
2 – Kurt Busch
18 – Kyle Busch

Gatorade Duels

The Gatorade Duels, held on February 12, are a pair of qualifying races to set the field for the Daytona 500.

Race 1 results
24 – Jeff Gordon
14 – Tony Stewart
48 – Jimmie Johnson
20 – Joey Logano
8 – Aric Almirola
2 – Kurt Busch
9 – Kasey Kahne
36 – Scott Riggs
98 – Paul Menard
26 – Jamie McMurray

Race 2 results
18 – Kyle Busch
5 – Mark Martin
83 – Brian Vickers
42 – Juan Pablo Montoya
11 – Denny Hamlin
96 – Bobby Labonte
88 – Dale Earnhardt Jr.
99 – Carl Edwards
41 – Jeremy Mayfield
44 – A. J. Allmendinger

2009 Daytona 500

The 2009 Daytona 500 was held on February 15.  Martin Truex Jr. qualified on the pole.  On lap 152, the race was halted because of rain and when NASCAR determined they could not get the race restarted, the race was called official.

Top 10 results
17 – Matt Kenseth
29 – Kevin Harvick
44 – A. J. Allmendinger
33 – Clint Bowyer
19 – Elliott Sadler
6 – David Ragan
55 – Michael Waltrip
14 – Tony Stewart
43 – Reed Sorenson
2 – Kurt Busch
Failed to qualify: No. 87 – Joe Nemechek, No. 08 – Boris Said, No. 09 – Brad Keselowski, No. 27 – Kirk Shelmerdine, No. 71 – Mike Wallace, No. 37 – Tony Raines, No. 73 – Mike Garvey, No. 75 – Derrike Cope, No. 23 – Mike Skinner, No. 51 – Kelly Bires, No. 46 – Carl Long, No. 64 – Geoff Bodine, No. 57 – Norm Benning, No. 60 – James Hylton (withdrew)

Auto Club 500

The Auto Club 500 was run on February 22 at Auto Club Speedway. Brian Vickers won the pole for this race, but had to start in the back of the field due to an engine change.  Despite the caution flag coming out for rain on 4 occasions, NASCAR was still able to complete this race in its entirety. Matt Kenseth took the checkered flag and became the first driver since Jeff Gordon in 1997 to start off a Cup season by winning the first two races of the year.

Top 10 results
17 – Matt Kenseth
24 – Jeff Gordon
18 – Kyle Busch
16 – Greg Biffle
2 – Kurt Busch
11 – Denny Hamlin
99 – Carl Edwards
14 – Tony Stewart
48 – Jimmie Johnson
83 – Brian Vickers
Failed to qualify: No. 64 – Todd Bodine, No. 37 – Tony Raines, No. 51 – David Starr, No. 73 – Mike Garvey, No. 09 – Sterling Marlin

Shelby 427

The Shelby 427 was run at Las Vegas Motor Speedway on March 1.  Normally this race is 267 laps and 400 miles long, but for this year's running, Carroll Shelby International took over the title sponsorship of the race and decided to run the race 27 miles longer in honor of the Shelby 427 sports car.  Kyle Busch qualified on the pole for the race, but had to start in the back due to an engine change.  Busch would rally in the last part of the race to win from the pole.

Top 10 results
18 – Kyle Busch
33 – Clint Bowyer
31 – Jeff Burton
00 – David Reutimann
96 – Bobby Labonte
24 – Jeff Gordon
16 – Greg Biffle
83 – Brian Vickers
26 – Jamie McMurray
88 – Dale Earnhardt Jr.
Failed to qualify: No. 28 – Travis Kvapil, No. 66 – Dave Blaney, No. 73 – Mike Garvey, No. 41 – Jeremy Mayfield, No. 09 – Sterling Marlin, No. 36 – Scott Riggs, No. 37 – Tony Raines, No. 51 – Dexter Bean

Kobalt Tools 500

The Kobalt Tools 500 was held on March 8 at Atlanta Motor Speedway.  Mark Martin won the pole.  Kurt Busch started on the outside front row from second place and would go on to lead 234 laps on his way to a dominating win. This race was extended from 325 to 330 laps due to a green-white-checkered finish.

Top 10 results
2 – Kurt Busch
24 – Jeff Gordon
99 – Carl Edwards
29 – Kevin Harvick
83 – Brian Vickers
33 – Clint Bowyer
9 – Kasey Kahne
14 – Tony Stewart
48 – Jimmie Johnson
 1 – Martin Truex Jr.

Failed to qualify: No. 35 – Todd Bodine, No. 36 – Scott Riggs, No. 41 – Jeremy Mayfield, No. 64 – Geoff Bodine, No. 37 – Tony Raines

Food City 500

The Food City 500 was held on March 22 at Bristol Motor Speedway.  Mark Martin started on the pole.  One week after Kurt Busch dominated at Atlanta, his brother Kyle Busch would dominate this race.  Kyle Busch led 378 of the races 503 laps despite starting mid pack in 19th place.  This race was extended to 503 laps from its scheduled 500 due to a green-white-checkered finish.

Top 10 results
18 – Kyle Busch
11 – Denny Hamlin
48 – Jimmie Johnson
24 – Jeff Gordon
9 – Kasey Kahne
5 – Mark Martin
39 – Ryan Newman
31 – Jeff Burton
42 – Juan Pablo Montoya
47 – Marcos Ambrose

Failed to qualify: No. 36 – Scott Riggs, No. 41 – Jeremy Mayfield

Goody's Fast Pain Relief 500 

The Goody's Fast Pain Relief 500 was held at Martinsville Speedway on March 29.  Qualifying was rained out and points were used to set the field.  Jeff Gordon would be given the pole starting spot as a result.  Denny Hamlin led the bulk of the laps, leading 296 of 500.  Jimmie Johnson however, would hold off a hard charging Hamlin and give car owner Rick Hendrick an emotional win as Hendrick Motorsports was celebrating their 25th anniversary of the organization's first win right at this very track.

Top 10 results
48 – Jimmie Johnson
11 – Denny Hamlin
14 – Tony Stewart
24 – Jeff Gordon
33 – Clint Bowyer
39 – Ryan Newman
5 – Mark Martin
88 – Dale Earnhardt Jr.
44 – A. J. Allmendinger
26 – Jamie McMurray

Failed to qualify: No. 09 – Sterling Marlin, No. 37 – Tony Raines, No. 46 – Dennis Setzer, No. 75 – Derrike Cope, No. 73 – Mike Garvey (withdrew)

Samsung 500

The Samsung 500 was held on Sunday April 5, at Texas Motor Speedway.  David Reutimann won the pole.  Jeff Gordon would hold on from a hard charging Jimmie Johnson who was cutting into Gordon's lead and take the victory.  This was Jeff Gordon's first career victory at Texas.

Top 10 results
24 – Jeff Gordon
48 – Jimmie Johnson
16 – Greg Biffle
14 – Tony Stewart
17 – Matt Kenseth
5 – Mark Martin
42 – Juan Pablo Montoya
2 – Kurt Busch
31 – Jeff Burton
99 – Carl Edwards

Failed to qualify: No. 87 – Joe Nemechek, No. 82 – Scott Speed, No. 41 – Jeremy Mayfield, No. 64 – Todd Bodine, No. 36 – Scott Riggs

Subway Fresh Fit 500

The Subway Fresh Fit 500 was run on Saturday, April 18, at Phoenix International Raceway.  Mark Martin started on the pole, led 157 of the race's 312 laps, and went on to become the fourth driver in Cup Series history to win a points race over the age of 50.

Top 10 results
5 – Mark Martin
14 – Tony Stewart
2 – Kurt Busch
48 – Jimmie Johnson
16 – Greg Biffle
11 – Denny Hamlin
1 – Martin Truex Jr.
00 – David Reutimann
77 – Sam Hornish Jr.
99 – Carl Edwards

Failed to qualify: No. 64 – Todd Bodine, No. 41 – Jeremy Mayfield, No. 51 – Dexter Bean, No. 02 – Brandon Ash, No. 06 – Trevor Boys

Aaron's 499

The Aaron's 499 was run on Sunday, April 26, at Talladega Superspeedway.  Juan Pablo Montoya won the pole. This race is forever remembered for the final lap.  The tandem duo of Ryan Newman and Dale Earnhardt Jr. were running first and second coming to the white flag when another tandem duo of Carl Edwards and Nationwide Series regular Brad Keselowski drafted and blew right by Newman and Earnhardt Jr., breaking away down the back straightaway to settle the race among themselves.  Coming into the tri oval, Brad Keselowski started to peak outside, causing Edwards to react high when Keselowski quickly turned back into the inside finding some room and some momentum to start making a pass down to the inside.  Edwards tried to block Keselowski but when Brad's front end made contact with Carl's back end, it turned Carl Edwards' car sideways, causing the back end of his car to lift before being slammed into from the oncoming car of Ryan Newman.  The impact sent Carl Edwards' car crashing up into the catch fence that separates the fans from the action.  Brad Keselowski took the checkered flag to win his first career Sprint Cup Series race in just his 5th start.

Top 10 results
09 – Brad Keselowski
88 – Dale Earnhardt Jr.
39 – Ryan Newman
47 – Marcos Ambrose
82 – Scott Speed
2 – Kurt Busch
16 – Greg Biffle
83 – Brian Vickers
20 – Joey Logano
31 – Jeff Burton

Failed to qualify: No. 66 – Michael McDowell, No. 4 – Eric McClure, No. 64 – Geoff Bodine

 Not only was this Brad Keselowski's first career win in the Sprint Cup Series, it was also car owner James Finch's first and only career win in the series as well.
 After Carl Edwards' car came to a stop from his last lap crash just short of the finish line, Edwards got out of his car and physically ran from the wreckage to across the finish line, paying homage to the movie Talladega Nights: The Ballad of Ricky Bobby.  Edwards was officially credited with a 24th-place finish, completing 187 of 188 laps.

Crown Royal presents the Russ Friedman 400

The Crown Royal presents the Russ Friedman 400 was held on Saturday, May 2 at Richmond International Raceway.  Brian Vickers won the pole.

Top 10 results
18 – Kyle Busch
14 – Tony Stewart
31 – Jeff Burton
39 – Ryan Newman
5 – Mark Martin
77 – Sam Hornish Jr.
26 – Jamie McMurray
24 – Jeff Gordon
07 – Casey Mears
42 – Juan Pablo Montoya

Failed to qualify: No. 64 – Todd Bodine, No. 06 – Trevor Boys

Southern 500 presented by GoDaddy.Com

The Southern 500 presented by GoDaddy.com was held at Darlington Raceway on Saturday, May 9.  Matt Kenseth won the pole.

Top 10 results
5 – Mark Martin
48 – Jimmie Johnson
14 – Tony Stewart
39 – Ryan Newman
24 – Jeff Gordon
1 – Martin Truex Jr.
25 – Brad Keselowski
16 – Greg Biffle
20 – Joey Logano
17 – Matt Kenseth

Failed to qualify: No. 41 – Jeremy Mayfield*, No. 82 – Scott Speed, No. 64 – Geoff Bodine (withdrew)

First time since 1999 that Mark Martin won multiple races in a single season.
Jeremy Mayfield had already failed to make the field, but just a few short hours before the start of the race, it has been announced that Mayfield has been suspended by NASCAR for violating its substance abuse policy. This marked the end of his career.
Scott Speed would race after Joe Nemechek gave up his seat.

Sprint All-Star Race XXV

The 2009 NASCAR Sprint All-Star Race is a non-points event, held on Saturday, May 16, at the Lowe's Motor Speedway. Sam Hornish Jr. won the Sprint Showdown race prior to the start of the All-Star Race, allowing him and runner up Jamie McMurray to transfer into the main event.  Joey Logano won the fan vote that also lets one driver not eligible to run the All-Star race to make the event on account of a popular vote by the fans.  Jimmie Johnson led the first 50 laps in the event before the lead switched back and forth between Kyle Busch and Jeff Gordon.  Matt Kenseth would take the lead on lap 95, but with four laps to go Tony Stewart pulled up alongside in what was an exciting battle for the lead.  Stewart would overtake Kenseth with two laps to go and hold on for the race win.

Top 10 results
14 – Tony Stewart
17 – Matt Kenseth
2 – Kurt Busch
11 – Denny Hamlin
99 – Carl Edwards
5 – Mark Martin
18 – Kyle Busch
20 – Joey Logano
26 – Jamie McMurray
88 – Dale Earnhardt Jr.

Coca-Cola 600

The 50th Coca-Cola 600, NASCAR's longest race of the season, was scheduled to run on Sunday, May 24, but due to rain the race was postponed to Monday, May 25 on Memorial Day.  Ryan Newman won the pole.  On lap 222, rain hit the track throwing out the yellow flag.  When drivers and teams decided on pit strategy in the ensuing couple laps, David Reutimann chose to stay out on the track, inheriting the race lead.  The race was stopped on lap 227 and never restarted.  Reutimann was declared the winner.

Top 10 results
00 – David Reutimann
39 – Ryan Newman
7 – Robby Gordon
99 – Carl Edwards
83 – Brian Vickers
18 – Kyle Busch
9 – Kasey Kahne
42 – Juan Pablo Montoya
20 – Joey Logano
17 – Matt Kenseth

Failed to qualify: No. 41 – J. J. Yeley, No. 73 – Mike Garvey, No. 64 – Todd Bodine, No. 06 – David Starr

 This was David Reutimann's first career Sprint Cup Series victory.
 The win was also the first for Michael Waltrip Racing and for Michael Waltrip as an owner.
 This was the shortest running of the Coca-Cola 600 in the race's history.
 Due to the race being held on Memorial Day, on lap 163, or at 3:00 pm EDT, NASCAR threw the caution flag and then momentarily threw the red flag and stopped the race to hold a moment of silence in honor of those who died serving in the United States Military.

Autism Speaks 400

The Autism Speaks 400 was held at Dover International Speedway on Sunday, May 31.  David Reutimann won the pole for the race.  Jimmie Johnson was the class of the field, leading 298 of 400 laps.  Johnson would pass Tony Stewart with a couple laps to go and take the win.

Top 10 results
48 – Jimmie Johnson
14 – Tony Stewart
16 – Greg Biffle
17 – Matt Kenseth
2 – Kurt Busch
9 – Kasey Kahne
99 – Carl Edwards
39 – Ryan Newman
07 – Casey Mears
5 – Mark Martin

Failed to qualify: No. 25 – Brad Keselowski, No. 13 – Max Papis, No. 75 – Derrike Cope, No. 06 – David Starr, No. 41 – J. J. Yeley (withdrew), No. 64 – Todd Bodine (withdrew)

Pocono 500

The Pocono 500 was held on Sunday, June 7 at Pocono Raceway. Tony Stewart won the pole. He came from the rear of the field due to starting in a backup car after crashing in practice. And Stewart also won the race.

Top 10 results
14 – Tony Stewart
99 – Carl Edwards
00 – David Reutimann
24 – Jeff Gordon
39 – Ryan Newman
47 – Marcos Ambrose
48 – Jimmie Johnson
42 – Juan Pablo Montoya
31 – Jeff Burton
77 – Sam Hornish Jr.

Failed to qualify: No. 75 – Derrike Cope, No. 64 – Mike Wallace, No. 37 – Tony Raines, No. 06 – Trevor Boys (withdrew)

Lifelock 400

The LifeLock 400 was held on Sunday, June 14 at Michigan International Speedway. Brian Vickers took the pole but Mark Martin won the race.

Top 10 results
5 – Mark Martin
24 – Jeff Gordon
11 – Denny Hamlin
99 – Carl Edwards
16 – Greg Biffle
42 – Juan Pablo Montoya
14 – Tony Stewart
2 – Kurt Busch
83 – Brian Vickers
33 – Clint Bowyer

Failed to qualify: No. 36 – Mike Skinner

Toyota/Save Mart 350

The Toyota/Save Mart 350 was held on Sunday, June 21 at Infineon Raceway. Brian Vickers took the pole but Kasey Kahne won the race.

Top 10 results
9 – Kasey Kahne
14 – Tony Stewart
47 – Marcos Ambrose
48 – Jimmie Johnson
11 – Denny Hamlin
42 – Juan Pablo Montoya
44 – A. J. Allmendinger
33 – Clint Bowyer
24 – Jeff Gordon
19 – Elliott Sadler

Failed to qualify: No. 82 – Scott Speed, No. 27 – Tom Hubert, No. 37 – Chris Cook, No. 36 – Brian Simo, No. 87 – Joe Nemechek (qualified but was replaced by Scott Speed)

Lenox Industrial Tools 301

The Lenox Industrial Tools 301 was held on Sunday, June 28 at New Hampshire Motor Speedway. Tony Stewart took the pole. The race was stopped on lap 273 due to rain, giving Joey Logano the win.

Top 10 results
20 – Joey Logano
24 – Jeff Gordon
2 – Kurt Busch
00 – David Reutimann
14 – Tony Stewart
09 – Brad Keselowski
18 – Kyle Busch
77 – Sam Hornish Jr.
48 – Jimmie Johnson
9 – Kasey Kahne

Failed to qualify: No. 51 – Dexter Bean, No. 27 – Ted Christopher, No. 64 – Mike Wallace (withdrew)

This was Joey Logano's first career Cup Series victory.

Coke Zero 400

The Coke Zero 400 was held on Saturday, July 4 at Daytona International Speedway. Tony Stewart took the pole and won the race. Stewart spun Kyle Busch coming to the finish line to win the race.

Top 10 results
14 – Tony Stewart
48 – Jimmie Johnson
11 – Denny Hamlin
99 – Carl Edwards
2 – Kurt Busch
47 – Marcos Ambrose
83 – Brian Vickers
17 – Matt Kenseth
42 – Juan Pablo Montoya
19 – Elliott Sadler

Failed to qualify: No. 13 – Max Papis, No. 64 – Mike Wallace (withdrew)

LifeLock.com 400

The LifeLock.com 400 was held on Saturday, July 11 at Chicagoland Speedway. Brian Vickers took the pole but Mark Martin won the race.

Top 10 results
5 – Mark Martin
24 – Jeff Gordon
9 – Kasey Kahne
14 – Tony Stewart
11 – Denny Hamlin
39 – Ryan Newman
83 – Brian Vickers
48 – Jimmie Johnson
33 – Clint Bowyer
42 – Juan Pablo Montoya

Failed to qualify: No. 64 – Mike Wallace, No. 51 – Dexter Bean, No 37 – Tony Raines

Allstate 400 at the Brickyard

The Allstate 400 was held on Sunday, July 26 at Indianapolis Motor Speedway. Mark Martin took the pole but Jimmie Johnson won the race.

Top 10 results
48 – Jimmie Johnson
5 – Mark Martin
14 – Tony Stewart
16 – Greg Biffle
83 – Brian Vickers
29 – Kevin Harvick
9 – Kasey Kahne
00 – David Reutimann
24 – Jeff Gordon
17 – Matt Kenseth

Failed to qualify: No. 09 – Sterling Marlin, No 13 – Max Papis,  No. 75 – Derrike Cope, No. 64 – Mike Wallace (withdrew)

Sunoco Red Cross Pennsylvania 500

The Sunoco Red Cross Pennsylvania 500 was held on Monday, August 3 at Pocono Raceway. Tony Stewart took the pole but Denny Hamlin won the race.

Top 10 results
11 – Denny Hamlin
42 – Juan Pablo Montoya
33 – Clint Bowyer
77 – Sam Hornish Jr.
9 – Kasey Kahne
83 – Brian Vickers
5 – Mark Martin
24 – Jeff Gordon
2 – Kurt Busch
14 – Tony Stewart

Failed to qualify: No. 75 – Derrike Cope (withdrew)

Heluva Good! Sour Cream Dips at The Glen

The Heluva Good! Sour Cream Dips at The Glen was held on Monday, August 10 at Watkins Glen International. Jimmie Johnson took the pole but Tony Stewart won the race.

Top 10 results
14 – Tony Stewart
47 – Marcos Ambrose
99 – Carl Edwards
18 – Kyle Busch
16 – Greg Biffle
42 – Juan Pablo Montoya
2 – Kurt Busch
13 – Max Papis*
33 – Clint Bowyer
11 – Denny Hamlin

Failed to qualify: No. 87 – Joe Nemechek, No. 36 – Brian Simo,  No. 70 – David Gilliland

Max Papis picked up his best finish in the Cup Series and his first top-ten finish.

Carfax 400

The Carfax 400 was held on Sunday, August 16 at Michigan International Speedway. Brian Vickers took the pole and won the race.

Top 10 results
83 – Brian Vickers
24 – Jeff Gordon
88 – Dale Earnhardt Jr.
99 – Carl Edwards
77 – Sam Hornish Jr.
07 – Casey Mears
20 – Joey Logano
33 – Clint Bowyer
00 – David Reutimann
11 – Denny Hamlin

Failed to qualify: No. 37 – Tony Raines, No. 08 – Terry Labonte (withdrew),  No. 64 – Mike Wallace (withdrew)

Sharpie 500

The Sharpie 500 was held on Saturday, August 22 at Bristol Motor Speedway. Mark Martin took the pole but Kyle Busch won the race.

Top 10 results
18 – Kyle Busch
5 – Mark Martin
47 – Marcos Ambrose
16 – Greg Biffle
11 – Denny Hamlin
39 – Ryan Newman
2 – Kurt Busch
48 – Jimmie Johnson
88 – Dale Earnhardt Jr.
17 – Matt Kenseth

Failed to qualify: No. 36 – Mike Skinner, No. 13 – Max Papis, No. 64 – Mike Wallace,  No. 09 – Aric Almirola, No. 51 – Dexter Bean (withdrew)

Pep Boys Auto 500

The Pep Boys Auto 500 was held on Sunday, September 6 at Atlanta Motor Speedway. Martin Truex Jr. took the pole but Kasey Kahne won the race.

Top 10 results
9 – Kasey Kahne
29 – Kevin Harvick
42 – Juan Pablo Montoya
00 – David Reutimann
5 – Mark Martin
11 – Denny Hamlin
83 – Brian Vickers
24 – Jeff Gordon
39 – Ryan Newman
16 – Greg Biffle

Failed to qualify: No. 78 – Regan Smith, No. 36 – Patrick Carpentier, No. 37 – Tony Raines

Chevy Rock & Roll 400

The Chevy Rock & Roll 400 was held on Saturday, September 12 at Richmond International Raceway. Mark Martin took the pole but Denny Hamlin won the race.

Top 10 results
11 – Denny Hamlin
2 – Kurt Busch
24 – Jeff Gordon
5 – Mark Martin
18 – Kyle Busch
33 – Clint Bowyer
83 – Brian Vickers
77 – Sam Hornish Jr.
29 – Kevin Harvick
39 – Ryan Newman

Failed to qualify: No. 37 – Tony Raines

Chase for the Sprint Cup

Sylvania 300

The Sylvania 300 was held on Sunday, September 20 at New Hampshire Motor Speedway. Juan Pablo Montoya took the pole but Mark Martin won the race.

Top 10 results
5 – Mark Martin
11 – Denny Hamlin
42 – Juan Pablo Montoya
48 – Jimmie Johnson
18 – Kyle Busch
2 – Kurt Busch
39 – Ryan Newman
19 – Elliott Sadler
16 – Greg Biffle
33 – Clint Bowyer

Failed to qualify: No. 75 – Derrike Cope, No. 51 – Dexter Bean
This was Martin's 40th and final victory in his Cup career.

AAA 400

The AAA 400 was held on Sunday, September 27 at Dover International Speedway. Jimmie Johnson took the pole and won the race.

Top 10 results
48 – Jimmie Johnson
5 – Mark Martin
17 – Matt Kenseth
42 – Juan Pablo Montoya
2 – Kurt Busch
24 – Jeff Gordon
44 – A. J. Allmendinger
9 – Kasey Kahne
14 – Tony Stewart
39 – Ryan Newman

Failed to qualify: No. 4 – Scott Wimmer

Price Chopper 400

The Price Chopper 400 was held on Sunday, October 4 at Kansas Speedway. Mark Martin took the pole but Tony Stewart won the race.

Top 10 results
14 – Tony Stewart
24 – Jeff Gordon
16 – Greg Biffle
42 – Juan Pablo Montoya
11 – Denny Hamlin
9 – Kasey Kahne
5 – Mark Martin
00 – David Reutimann
48 – Jimmie Johnson
99 – Carl Edwards

Failed to qualify: No. 04 – David Gilliland, No. 36 – Michael McDowell, No. 37 – Kevin Hamlin

Pepsi 500

The Pepsi 500 was held on Sunday, October 11 at Auto Club Speedway. Denny Hamlin took the pole but Jimmie Johnson won the race.

Top 10 results
48 – Jimmie Johnson
24 – Jeff Gordon
42 – Juan Pablo Montoya
5 – Mark Martin
14 – Tony Stewart
99 – Carl Edwards
6 – David Ragan
2 – Kurt Busch
33 – Clint Bowyer
29 – Kevin Harvick

Failed to qualify: No. 37 – Tony Raines, No. 64 – Mike Wallace

NASCAR Banking 500 only from Bank of America

The NASCAR Banking 500 only from Bank of America was held on Saturday, October 17 at Lowe's Motor Speedway. Jimmie Johnson took the pole and won the race.

Top 10 results
48 – Jimmie Johnson
17 – Matt Kenseth
9 – Kasey Kahne
24 – Jeff Gordon
20 – Joey Logano
33 – Clint Bowyer
07 – Casey Mears
18 – Kyle Busch
1 – Martin Truex Jr.
2 – Kurt Busch

Failed to qualify: No. 36 – Michael McDowell, No. 09 – Sterling Marlin, No. 66 – Dave Blaney, No. 37 – Travis Kvapil, No. 64 – Mike Wallace (withdrew)

TUMS Fast Relief 500

The TUMS Fast Relief 500 was held on Sunday, October 25 at Martinsville Speedway. Ryan Newman took the pole but Denny Hamlin won the race.

Top 10 results
11 – Denny Hamlin
48 – Jimmie Johnson
42 – Juan Pablo Montoya
18 – Kyle Busch
24 – Jeff Gordon
26 – Jamie McMurray
39 – Ryan Newman
5 – Mark Martin
14 – Tony Stewart
29 – Kevin Harvick

Failed to qualify: No. 73 – Josh Wise, No. 75 – Derrike Cope (withdrew)

AMP Energy 500

The AMP Energy 500 was held on Sunday, November 1 at Talladega Superspeedway. Jimmie Johnson took the pole but Jamie McMurray won the race.

Top 10 results
26 – Jamie McMurray
9 – Kasey Kahne
20 – Joey Logano
16 – Greg Biffle
31 – Jeff Burton
48 – Jimmie Johnson
55 – Michael Waltrip
09 – Brad Keselowski
19 – Elliott Sadler
71 – Bobby Labonte

Failed to qualify: No.37 Tony Raines (withdrew)

Dickies 500

The Dickies 500 was held on Sunday, November 8 at Texas Motor Speedway. Jeff Gordon took the pole but Kurt Busch won the race.

Top 10 results
2 – Kurt Busch
11 – Denny Hamlin
17 – Matt Kenseth
5 – Mark Martin
29 – Kevin Harvick
14 – Tony Stewart
33 – Clint Bowyer
16 – Greg Biffle
31 – Jeff Burton
44 – A. J. Allmendinger

Failed to qualify: No. 37 – Tony Raines, No. 66 – Dave Blaney,  No. 13 – Max Papis, No. 09 – Mike Bliss, No. 08 – Derrike Cope (withdrew)

Checker O'Reilly Auto Parts 500

The Checker O'Reilly Auto Parts 500 was held on Sunday, November 15 at Phoenix International Raceway. Martin Truex Jr. took the pole but Jimmie Johnson won the race.

Top 10 results
48 – Jimmie Johnson
31 – Jeff Burton
11 – Denny Hamlin
5 – Mark Martin
1 – Martin Truex Jr.
2 – Kurt Busch
33 – Clint Bowyer
42 – Juan Pablo Montoya
24 – Jeff Gordon
00 – David Reutimann

Failed to qualify: No. 78 – Regan Smith, No. 70 – Kevin Conway, No. 02 – Brandon Ash

Ford 400

The Ford 400 was held on Sunday, November 22 at Homestead-Miami Speedway. Jimmie Johnson took the pole but Denny Hamlin won the race.

Top 10 results
11 – Denny Hamlin
31 – Jeff Burton
29 – Kevin Harvick
2 – Kurt Busch
48 – Jimmie Johnson
24 – Jeff Gordon
99 – Carl Edwards
18 – Kyle Busch
1 – Martin Truex Jr.
44 – A. J. Allmendinger

Failed to qualify: No. 87 – Joe Nemechek, No. 66 – Dave Blaney, No. 70 – Mike Skinner, No. 13 – Max Papis, No. 09 – David Stremme, No. 7 – Matt Crafton (qualified for Robby Gordon)

Results and standings

Drivers' championship

(key) Bold - Pole position awarded by time. Italics - Pole position set by owner's points standings. * – Most laps led.

Rookie of the Year
The clear favorite for Rookie of the year was 18-year-old standout Joey Logano. Despite struggling early in the year, Logano became the youngest winner in Sprint Cup Series history by winning the rain shortened Lenox Industrial Tools 301. The other competitors, former Formula One drivers Scott Speed and Max Papis, struggled to adjust to stock cars.

See also
2009 NASCAR Nationwide Series
2009 NASCAR Camping World Truck Series
2009 NASCAR Camping World East Series
2009 NASCAR Camping World West Series
2009 NASCAR Canadian Tire Series
2009 NASCAR Corona Series
2009 NASCAR Mini Stock Series

References

External links
2009 NASCAR Sprint Cup Series at ESPN
NASCAR.com
NASCAR 2010 Schedule Released
RacingOne 
Jayski's Silly Season Site
Speed Channel
ThatsRacin.com
2009 Sprint Cup Series schedule
Racing-Reference.info

 
NASCAR Cup Series seasons